Chrysomphalus is a genus of scales and mealybugs in the family Diaspididae. There are about 16 described species in Chrysomphalus.

Species
 Chrysomphalus aberrans Mamet, 1951
 Chrysomphalus ansei (Green, 1916)
 Chrysomphalus aonidum (Linnaeus, 1758)
 Chrysomphalus bifasciculatus Ferris, 1938
 Chrysomphalus dictyospermi (Morgan, 1889)
 Chrysomphalus diversicolor (Green, 1923)
 Chrysomphalus fodiens (Maskell, 1892)
 Chrysomphalus greeni Leonardi, 1914
 Chrysomphalus minutus Kotinsky, 1908
 Chrysomphalus mume Tang, 1984
 Chrysomphalus nulliporus McKenzie, 1939
 Chrysomphalus pinnulifer (Maskell, 1891)
 Chrysomphalus propsimus Banks, 1906
 Chrysomphalus silvestrii Chou, 1946
 Chrysomphalus trifasciculatus Brimblecombe, 1959
 Chrysomphalus variabilis McKenzie, 1943

References

Further reading

 
 
 
 

Aspidiotina